Blackminster is a Hamlet in Worcestershire, England.
Features include a large middle school, haulage and horticultural produce companies and a converted ex-railway station business/retail park.

Villages in Worcestershire